Orange wine, also known as skin-contact white wine, skin-fermented white wine, or amber wine, is a type of wine made from white wine grapes where the grape skins are not removed, as in typical white wine production, and stay in contact with the juice for days or even months. This contrasts with conventional white wine production, which involves crushing the grapes and quickly moving the juice off the skins into the fermentation vessel. The skins contain color pigment, phenols and tannins that would normally be considered undesirable for white wines, while for red wines skin contact and maceration is a vital part of the winemaking process that gives red wine its color, flavor, and texture.

History
The practice has a long history in winemaking dating back hundreds of years in Slovenia and Friuli-Venezia Giulia, and thousands of years in the Eastern European wine producing country of Georgia. The practice was repopularized by Italian and Slovenian winemakers, after visiting Georgia and importing qvevris, initially in the cross-border Friuli-Venezia Giulia wine and Gorizia Hills regions, while there is also production in Spain, Slovenia, Croatia, Slovakia, Austria, Germany, New Zealand, and California.

Skin-fermented white wines were common in Italy up until the 1950s and 1960s, but fell out of fashion as technically 'correct' and fresh white wines came to dominate the market.

Orange wine
The popular term orange wine was coined by a British wine importer, David A. Harvey, in 2004. This style of wines can also be known by their color references of having an amber or orange tinge that the base white wine receives due to its contact with the coloring pigments of the grape skins.

In Georgia skin-contact white wine is historically known as “ქარვისფერი ღვინო” (karvisperi ghvino) – amber wine.

National Orange Wine Day is celebrated annually on October 6.

Wine styles
The basic differences of orange wine with the other wine 'colors' are based on the color of the grape and the duration of their skin contact.

Red wine is made with red grapes. After the red grapes are crushed, their skins stay in contact for a period of 1 week to 1 month, and the wine gets a red or deep red color. Rosé, at least when rosé wine is the primary product,  is produced with the skin contact method, using red grapes. After the grapes are crushed, their skins only stay in contact a few hours before pressing, but in that short period they give the wine the characteristic light pink hue. 

White wine is made either with red or white grapes. The grapes are pressed and their skins are removed immediately. Because the grape skins do not "participate" in the fermentation, their color does not matter and the wine acquires a neutral, green to slightly yellow hue. Orange wine is made with white grapes. After they are crushed, their skins stay in contact for 1 month to 6 months, and the wine acquires an amber, orange color.

See also

References

Wine styles